Wallace McArthur "Butch" Davis (born June 19, 1958) is an American former professional baseball outfielder and current coach. He played in Major League Baseball (MLB) from 1983 through 1994.

Playing career
During his active career, Davis played for five different teams in parts of eight seasons spanning 1983–1994. He was born in Martin County, North Carolina.

Davis was selected by the Kansas City Royals in the 12th round of the 1980 MLB Draft out of East Carolina University in Greenville, North Carolina.

He started his majors career with the Royals in 1983, playing for them through 1984 before joining the Pittsburgh Pirates (1987), Baltimore Orioles (1988–1989), Los Angeles Dodgers (1991) and Texas Rangers (1993–1994).

Davis had a promising debut, hitting a .344/.359/.508 slash line (BA/OBP/SLG) with 62 total bases in 33 games, but never again came close to matching those numbers in his next seven seasons.

Davis also played 13 seasons in the Minor Leagues, batting a combined .297/.346/.456 line with 291 stolen bases in 1440 games.

In between, Davis played winter ball with the Leones del Caracas club of the Venezuelan League during the 1991–1992 season.

Coaching career
Following his playing career, Davis has been a long-time hitting coach in the Orioles minors system, mainly at Double-A Bowie Baysox (2000; 2003–2005; 2013–2014), as well as a roving outfield and bunting instructor in the farm system (2007–2012). Additionally, he managed the Gulf Coast League Orioles (1997–1998) and Class-A Delmarva Shorebirds (1999).

On December 1, 2014, Davis was named first base coach of the Minnesota Twins on the staff of  Twins' manager Paul Molitor. He was fired after the 2016 season.

Davis was hired to be the hitting coach for the Orioles AAA affiliate Norfolk Tides for the 2018 season. He was named the fundamentals coach for the Bowie Baysox prior to the 2020 season.

Personal
Davis is married with two children and currently lives in Garner, North Carolina.

He made a brief cameo appearance in the 1988 baseball film Bull Durham, starring Kevin Costner, Tim Robbins and Susan Sarandon.

References

1958 births
Living people
African-American baseball coaches
African-American baseball players
American expatriate baseball players in Canada
Albuquerque Dukes players
Baltimore Orioles players
Baseball coaches from North Carolina
Baseball players from North Carolina
Charlotte Knights players
East Carolina Pirates baseball players
Fort Myers Royals players
Gulf Coast Royals players
Jacksonville Suns players
Kansas City Royals players
Las Vegas Stars (baseball) players
Leones del Caracas players
American expatriate baseball players in Venezuela
Los Angeles Dodgers players
Major League Baseball first base coaches
Major League Baseball outfielders
Minnesota Twins coaches
Minor league baseball coaches
Minor league baseball managers
Oklahoma City 89ers players
Omaha Royals players
People from Williamston, North Carolina
Pittsburgh Pirates players
Rochester Red Wings players
Syracuse Chiefs players
Texas Rangers players
Vancouver Canadians players
21st-century African-American people
20th-century African-American sportspeople